was a Japanese samurai warrior of the Sengoku period. He was known as one of the "Twenty-Four Generals of Takeda Shingen". 

Moritomo was the son-in-law of the famed Takeda retainer Yamagata Masakage. 
Moritomo served Takeda clan during the Battle of Mikatagahara in 1572, and the Battle of Nagashino in 1575.

References

Further reading
West, C.E. and F.W. Seal (2005). "The Samurai Archives."

External links 
  "Legendary Takeda's 24 Generals" at Yamanashi-kankou.jp

1537 births
1575 deaths
Samurai
Japanese warriors killed in battle
Takeda retainers